Annegret is a German feminine given name. Notable people with the name include:
 Annegret Brießmann (born 1972), 1.0 point wheelchair basketball player
 Annegret Dietrich (born 1980), German-born Swiss bobsledder
 Annegret Kober (born 1957), German retired backstroke swimmer
 Annegret Kramp-Karrenbauer (born 1962), German CDU politician
 Annegret Kroniger (born 1952), German athlete who mainly competed in the 100 metres
 Annegret Richter (born 1950), German athlete and the 1976 Olympic 100 m champion
 Annegret Soltau (born 1946), German visual artist
 Annegret Strauch (born 1968), German rower

Fictional
 Annegret Wittkamp, a character on Verbotene Liebe